Mahaya Petrosian (born 3 January 1970) is an Iranian actress of Armenian descent. She is also a director, A Beautiful Snowy Day being her first movie as director.

Biography 
Mahaya Petrosian was born in Tehran on January 4, 1980, and after earning a diploma, she went to the Faculty of Fine Arts and was able to graduate in theater from this university. Mahaya Petrosyan was from the Armenian minority living in Tehran and converted to Islam after marrying a Muslim man. Her first artistic activity was acting in the movie "Love and Death" directed by Mohammad Reza Alami and she entered the field of acting. Acting in this film did not have much work for him due to his small role, but by acting in the film The Last Screen and his second cinematic activity, he was able to show his abilities.

Filmography

See also
Tahmineh Milani
Mohsen Makhmalbaf
Iranian cinema
Persian women

References

External links
Official Website

1970 births
Living people
Iranian actresses
People from Tehran
Iranian film actresses
Iranian stage actresses
Ethnic Armenian actresses
University of Tehran alumni
Iranian people of Armenian descent
Crystal Simorgh for Best Supporting Actress winners